John E. Peterson (born December 25, 1938) is an American Republican politician from the Commonwealth of Pennsylvania. From 1997 to 2009, he represented the state's mainly rural and largely Republican 5th Congressional district in the U.S. House.

Biography
John Peterson was born in Titusville, Pennsylvania on December 25, 1938. He served in the Army, both active and reserve duty, from 1957 through 1963. Following his honorable discharge as a Specialist, Peterson owned and operated a retail food market in his hometown of Pleasantville for 26 years. Peterson also completed a 3-year Rural Leadership Program through Penn State University.

Peterson's first public office was on his local borough council, where he served for eight years. He was first elected to the Pennsylvania House of Representatives on November 8, 1977 In 1984, Peterson was elected to the Pennsylvania Senate where he served for 12 years, chairing both the Public Health and Welfare Committee and the Republican Policy Committee. While in the legislature, Peterson authored the Welfare Reform, Living Will, and AIDS Confidentiality legislation. He also created five Higher Education Councils in his district which enable students from rural areas to earn university degrees right in their own community.

In 1996, Peterson was elected to serve Pennsylvania's Fifth Congressional District in the U.S. House of Representatives. As a freshman Member of the Education and Workforce Committee, Peterson served on conference committees that made higher education more accessible to all Americans and improved the delivery system for technical education.

Peterson was appointed to the House Appropriations Committee in 1998, where he was a member of the Subcommittee on Labor, Health and Human Services and Education, the Subcommittee on the Interior and Environment as well as the Subcommittee on Homeland Security.

Peterson also served as Co-Chair of the Congressional Rural Caucus, a bipartisan coalition of more than 140 Members of Congress committed to strengthening and revitalizing rural communities across America. As the representative of Pennsylvania's largest, most rural district, Peterson was committed to strengthening job creation and economic development strategies; improving access to quality, affordable health care; expanding the availability of new technologies and technical education in rural areas; and enhancing the quality of life for his constituents.

In recognition of his support for rural economic development, Peterson was presented with the Congressional Partnership Award by the National Association of Development Organizations. Peterson was also named Policymaker of the Year by the Association for Career and Technical Education, and was honored by the National Rural Health Association as their 2002 Legislator of the Year for his efforts to improve Medicare funding for rural hospitals, nursing homes and other health care providers.

Peterson has been recognized by numerous other organizations including the National Association of Community Health Centers, the Pennsylvania Association of Home Health Agencies, the Seniors Coalition, the U.S. Chamber of Commerce, the National Association of Manufacturers, the National Federation of Independent Businesses, Americans for Tax Reform, the Association of Consulting Foresters, and the Pennsylvania Recreation and Parks Society.

Peterson has been married to his wife, Saundra, for more than 30 years. They have a son and two granddaughters. Peterson is a Methodist.

Environmental record
Peterson received the lowest possible environmental rating from the League of Conservation Voters in 2006, casting what the group qualified as anti-environment votes on twelve out of twelve critical issues ranging from oil drilling offshore and in the Arctic National Wildlife Refuge, salvage logging and logging roads, and the Clean Water Act, to the Toxics Release Inventory program and low-income energy assistance. The conservative environmental group Republicans for Environmental Protection singled out Peterson as "Worst in the House in 2006" on environmental issues. In addition to assigning the representative a score of zero for his voting record, REP censured him individually for "efforts to remove the moratorium on Outer Continental Shelf gas drilling through the Interior appropriations process." According to the League of Conservation Voters, "natural gas drilling can create massive amounts of water and air pollution and can leave open the possibility of oil spills, which would be toxic for a wide variety of marine and coastal life."

Energy record

Peterson was among the most outspoken members of the U.S. House on increasing production of domestic energy, specifically natural gas. As a member of the Interior appropriations subcommittee, Peterson worked diligently to remove a 27-year-old moratorium on producing oil and gas on the Outer Continental Shelf (OCS). He has been referred to by President George W. Bush, who he has routinely taken on, as "Mr. Energy" and introduced the first energy production bill in the 110th House (2007–08)--the National Environment and Energy Development (NEED) Act, which is a natural gas production only bill.

On July 31, 2008, Peterson and Rep. Neil Abercrombie (D-Hawaii) introduced the first bipartisan energy production bill in the 110th Congress. The National Conservation, Environment and Energy Independence Act, H.R. 6709, would transform the environment, and according to its supporters, put America on the road to energy independence. While locking up the first 25 miles of coastline and giving states the option to lock up an additional 25 miles, this legislation would remove the congressional moratorium on offshore energy production and use the royalties gained from that production to develop next generation alternative and renewable energy sources.

Retirement
In January 2008, Peterson announced he would be retiring from Congress at the end of his sixth term.  Glenn Thompson, a Republican, won Peterson's seat in the 2008 elections.

References

External links

 
 Federal Election Commission – John Peterson campaign finance reports and data
 On the Issues – John Peterson issue positions and quotes
 OpenSecrets.org – John E. Peterson campaign contributions
 Biography, voting record, and interest group ratings at Project Vote Smart
 Profile at SourceWatch
 Washington Post – Congress Votes Database: John E. Peterson voting record
 The Political Graveyard

|-

|-

|-

1938 births
Living people
People from Titusville, Pennsylvania
Republican Party members of the Pennsylvania House of Representatives
Republican Party Pennsylvania state senators
Pennsylvania State University alumni
United States Army soldiers
Methodists from Pennsylvania
American grocers
Military personnel from Pennsylvania
Republican Party members of the United States House of Representatives from Pennsylvania
21st-century American politicians